Provisions, Fiction and Gear is the third album, and the first on a major label, by the American alternative rock band MOTH.

Track listing
All songs written by Brad Stenz.
 I See Sound – 3:10
 Thinkin' Please – 3:36
 Hearing Things – 3:17
 Burning Down My Sanity – 4:08
 Last Night's Dream – 3:31
 Leftovers – 3:17
 Lovers' Quarrel – 4:03
 Cocaine Star – 2:39
 Plastics Campaign – 3:18
 Sleepy – 3:48
 Straight Line – 4:42
 Not Really – 3:20

Reception

The album received enthusiastic reviews from music magazines including Rolling Stone, Alternative Press and CMJ.

Credits
 Brad Stenz – vocals, guitar
 Bob Gayol – guitar
 Tommy Stinson – bass guitar
 Josh Freese – drums

References 

2002 albums
Virgin Records albums
Moth (band) albums
Albums produced by Sean Beavan